Abū al-Jūd Muḥammad b. Aḥmad b. al-Layth was an Iranian mathematician who lived during 10th century and was a contemporary of Al-Biruni. He used conics to solve quartic and cubic equations, a century before the more famous work of Omar Khayyam, although his solution did not deal with all the cases.

Life 

Not much is known about his life. He seems to have lived in the east of Khurasan, within Samanid territory.  Sa'id al-Andalusi claimed that he lived in Valencia (Balansiya) and died in 1014 or 1015, but other sources didn't mention these information. It is likely that he became a scribe after acquiring basic knowledge on mathematics.

References

10th-century Iranian mathematicians
Samanid scholars